The Coro de Cámara de la Pontificia Universidad Católica de Puerto Rico (English: Resident Choir of the Pontifical Catholic University of Puerto Rico), more commonly referred to as the Coro de la PUCPR or simply El Coro de la Católica, is the choir of the Pontificia Universidad Católica de Puerto Rico in Ponce, Puerto Rico. It was founded in the 1950s and, after a period of inactivity, re-founded in 1973.  The Choir was directed by Rubén Colón Tarrats until 2017. Colón Tarrats also directed the Ponce Municipal Band. Its current director is Dr. Hugo Adames.

History of the Choir 
The choir was founded in the 1950s by music professor Ms. Falina Rivera, but it became inactive soon after. The choir was re-founded in 1973 by Argentinian priest Abel Di Marco, when he established himself in Ponce. Rubén Colón Tarrats became its director in 1994, when Abel di Marco retired.  In 2013, to commemorate the 40th anniversary of the choir, the University's Music Department prepared a Gala Concert dedicated to Abel Di Marco. In an interview given during this ceremony, Di Marco explained the circumstances of the re-creation of the choir:

About the Choir 

The choir consists of 23 singers, all university students of the PUCPR.  The choir, which has made numerous international presentations including one at St. Patrick's Cathedral in New York City, was also scheduled to sing at St. Peter's Basilica in the Vatican in 2013.  In addition to solo performances at the Universidad Catolica de Puerto Rico, the Choir has participated in international performances, at home and abroad, including performances with the Ponce High School Choir, the University of Puerto Rico at Ponce Choir, the Instituto de Música Juan Morel Campos Choir, the Academia Cristo Rey Choir, and the Coral Municipal de Ponce.

Accolades
The choir has received awards in Aruba (1995), Florida (1998), New York (1999), Dominican Republic (2001), Chile (2005), Canada (2010) and South Carolina (2011).

See also
 Coro de Niños de Ponce

References

Further reading
 Fay Fowlie de Flores. Ponce, Perla del Sur: Una Bibliográfica Anotada. Second Edition. 1997. Ponce, Puerto Rico: Universidad de Puerto Rico en Ponce. p. 276. Item 1382. 
 "El Coro de la Universidad Católica de Puerto Rico." Coral. Year 3 (1980) p. 4. (PUCPR).

University choirs
Puerto Rican musical groups
Musical groups from Ponce, Puerto Rico
Musical groups established in 1950
1950 establishments in Puerto Rico
1973 establishments in Puerto Rico